is a Japanese Nippon Professional Baseball player. He is currently with the Saitama Seibu Lions in Japan's Pacific League. Before playing for the Lions, he was a member of the Hanshin Tigers.

External links

1975 births
Hanshin Tigers players
Japanese baseball coaches
Japanese baseball players
Living people
Nippon Professional Baseball coaches
Nippon Professional Baseball infielders
Saitama Seibu Lions players
Seibu Lions players
Baseball people from Saitama (city)